Million Dollar Strong is a parody hip-hop music duo portrayed by Mike O'Connell and Ken Jeong, notable for the 2007 viral video "What's It Gonna Be?", which became popular on YouTube.  MTV announced a film based on the aspiring band.

See also
Comedy hip hop

References

External links
"What's It Gonna Be?" via Funny or Die

Viral videos